Caddo Mills is a city in Hunt County, Texas, United States. The population was 1,338 at the 2010 census, up from 1,149 at the 2000 census.

Geography

Caddo Mills is located in western Hunt County at  (33.064748, –96.229040). Texas State Highway 66 passes through the center of the city, leading northeast  to Greenville, the county seat, and southwest the same distance to Royse City.

West Caddo Creek, part of the Sabine River watershed, flows through the southwest corner of the city.

Demographics

As of the 2020 United States census, there were 1,495 people, 583 households, and 435 families residing in the city.

Education
The city is served by the Caddo Mills Independent School District.

Transportation

Major highways
  Interstate 30
  U.S. Highway 67 (runs concurrent with Interstate 30)
  State Highway 66

Air
The city of Caddo Mills owns the Caddo Mills Municipal Airport, which provides general-aviation services to the area.

Notable people
Guy Benton Johnson, sociologist

References

External links
City of Caddo Mills official website

Dallas–Fort Worth metroplex
Cities in Texas
Cities in Hunt County, Texas